Van der Burg is a Dutch toponymic surname meaning "from the fortress / stronghold". Variations are Van de Burg, Van den Burg,  Van den Burgh and Van der Burgh. Anglicized versions of these names show a variety of agglutinations and capitalizations. Notable people with the surname include:

Van der Burg / Vanderburg
Adriaan van der Burg (1693–1733), Dutch painter
Agnes Vanderburg (1901–1989), Native American (Salish) translator and writer
Ben van der Burg (born 1968), Dutch speed skater
Brigitte van der Burg (born 1961), Dutch politician
Dave van der Burg (born 1993), Dutch off-road bicycle racer
Dirk van der Burg (1721–1773), Dutch landscape painter and watercolorist
George VanderBurg (born 1957), Canadian politician
Helen Vanderburg (born 1959), Canadian synchronized swimmer
Johan van der Burg (died 1640), Dutch Governor of Formosa
Joost van der Burg (born 1993), Dutch track cyclist
Willem H. Vanderburg (born 1944), Dutch-born Canadian technologist and writer

Van Deburg
William L. Van Deburg (born 1948), American professor of Afro-American Studies

Van den Burg / Vandenburg
Hans Vandenburg (born 1946), Dutch pop musician
Herman Vandenburg Ames (1865–1935), American legal historian and documentary preservationist
Ieke van den Burg (born 1952), Dutch politician
Malcolm VandenBurg (born c.1950), English physician

Van den Burgh / Vandenburgh
G. van den Burgh (fl. 1938), Netherlands Indies footballer
Jane Vandenburgh (born 1948), American writer
John Van Denburgh (1872–1924), American herpetologist
Shelli VanDenburgh (born 1969), American politician

Van der Burgh / Vanderburgh
Cameron van der Burgh (born 1988), South African swimmer
Charles E. Vanderburgh (1829–1898), American jurist
Federal Vanderburgh (1788–1868), American physician and homeopath
Hendrick van der Burgh (1627–aft.1664), Dutch genre painter
Henry Vanderburgh (1760–1812), Indiana Territory judge, namesake of Vanderburgh County, Indiana
Pieter Daniel van der Burgh (1805–1879), Dutch landscape painter
Stephen Vanderburgh Harkness (1818–1868), American businessman

See also
Van der Burgh, Dutch surname
Van den Berg, Dutch surname
Vandenberg (surname), concatenated form of Dutch surname

References

Dutch-language surnames
Surnames of Dutch origin
Dutch toponymic surnames